The 1958 UCI Road World Championships took place from 30-31 August 1958 in Reims, France.

Events summary

References

 
UCI Road World Championships by year
W
R
R